Elyna may refer to:
Kobresia subg. Elyna, a subgenus of the genus Kobresia of plants in the sedge family, sometimes called bog sedges
1234 Elyna, an asteroid